Geovânia de Sá (born 30 March 1972) is a Brazilian politician and business administrator. She has spent her political career representing Santa Catarina, having served as state representative since 2015.

Personal life
She is the daughter of Itaci de Sá and Maria Elena Gonçalves. de Sá is a member of the Pentecostal church Assembleias de Deus, and is a member of the evangelical caucus in the legislature.

Political career
de Sá voted in favor of the impeachment motion of then-president Dilma Rousseff. de Sá would vote in favor of a similar corruption investigation into Rousseff's successor Michel Temer, and although she voted in favor of tax reforms she opposed the 2017 Brazilian labor reforms.

References

1968 births
Living people
People from Criciúma
Brazilian businesspeople
Brazilian Pentecostals
Brazilian women in politics
Brazilian Social Democracy Party politicians
Members of the Chamber of Deputies (Brazil) from Santa Catarina